Guillem Clua (born 1973) is a Spanish playwright and screenwriter with works both in Spanish and Catalan.

Biography 
Guillem Clua was born in Barcelona in 1973. After earning a licentiate degree in journalism from the UAB, he nurtured his writing skills at London Guildhall University. Upon joining Sala Becket, he began writing plays in 2001.

Some of his plays have been adapted into a film and television format: La piel en llamas (in which Clua is credited as co-writer), Smiley (in which Clua is credited as creator), and Invasión (in which Clua is credited as writer). He has also collaborated as screenwriter in television series such as El cor de la ciutat, Estoy vivo, Mercado Central, and The Innocent, and films such as God's Crooked Lines and The Communion Girl.

Accolades

References 

21st-century Spanish dramatists and playwrights
21st-century Spanish screenwriters
People from Barcelona
1973 births
Living people